Onychomachilis is an extinct genus of jumping bristletails in the family Machilidae. There is one described species in Onychomachilis, O. fisheri.

References

Archaeognatha
Articles created by Qbugbot